A paddle is an implement for mixing or pushing against liquids, typically in order to propel a boat.
Paddling is the act of propelling watercraft using paddles.

Paddle, Paddles or Paddling may also refer to:

Aquatics
 Dog paddle, a simple swimming stroke
 Paddling pool, shallow swimming pool for toddlers and infants
 Hand paddle, a device used in swimming to enhance arm strength

Sports and recreation
 Paddle, an alternate name for a racket
 Table tennis paddle, the racket in table tennis
 Paddle (game controller), a computer/video game controller
 Paddle tennis, similar to tennis, but with key differences
 Richard Hadlee, a New Zealand cricketer nicknamed Paddles

Other uses
 Mixing paddle, device used to mix liquids with solids
 Paddle (spanking), a device used in corporal punishment
 Traffic paddle, a device used by the police for traffic control
 An aircraft part for thrust vectoring
 Paddles, or paddle electrodes, parts of a manual external defibrillator
 Paddles, or wickets, valves to regulate flow of water into and out of canal lock chambers
 Paddles (Pillow Pal), a platypus made by Ty, Inc.
 Paddles, the callsign of the Landing Signal Officer on a US Navy Aircraft Carrier
 Paddles (cat) (d. 2017), a cat owned by New Zealand Prime Minister Jacinda Ardern
 Paddle (anatomy), the webbed foot of a semi-aquatic animal
 Paddle (company), London-based company, offering payments infrastructure for software companies.

See also
 Padel (disambiguation)
 Paddleball (disambiguation)
 Paddle steamer, a ship or boat with a steam engine and one or more paddle wheels
 Paddleboarding, a surface water sport

 
 

ca:Paddle